Wilson Pinto Gaspar (born 29 September 1990) is a Portuguese-born Angolan footballer who plays for Petro de Luanda and the Angola national football team.

International career
Gaspar made his senior international debut on 29 June 2017 in a COSAFA Cup draw against Malawi.

International goals
Scores and results list Angola's goal tally first.

References

External links
 
Zerozero.pt profile

1990 births
Living people
Angolan footballers
Association football defenders
Kabuscorp S.C.P. players
Atlético Petróleos de Luanda players
Girabola players
Angola international footballers
2019 Africa Cup of Nations players
Footballers from Porto
Portuguese footballers
CD Candal players
G.D. Ribeirão players
A.D. Lousada players
F.C. Vizela players
Portuguese sportspeople of Angolan descent